This is a list of notable women in the video game industry.

Notable women in the video game industry 

 Mabel Addis wrote the mainframe game The Sumerian Game (1964), becoming the first female video game designer.
 Anna Anthropy, American video game designer who has worked on multiple indie games such as Mighty Jill Off and is the game designer in residence at the DePaul University College of Computing and Digital Media.
 Dona Bailey, American game programmer who, along with Ed Logg in 1981, created the arcade video game Centipede.
 Laura Bailey, American voice actress 
 Ellen Beeman, American fantasy and science fiction author, cofounder the industry group Women in Games International, and computer game designer/producer since the 1990s Since 2014, she has been a faculty member at DigiPen Institute of Technology. She is credited for development of over 40 video games, for publishers including Disney, Electronic Arts, Microprose, Microsoft, Monolith, Origin, and Sega.
 Debbie Bestwick, British entrepreneur, founder of Team17.
 Danielle Bunten Berry, American game designer and programmer, known for the 1983 game M.U.L.E. (one of the first influential multiplayer games), and 1984's The Seven Cities of Gold. She was the recipient of a Lifetime Achievement Award from the Computer Game Developers Association.
 Connie Booth (business executive), American business executive as vice-president of Product Development at Sony Interactive Entertainment and advocate of many of SIE's first-party franchises since Crash Bandicoot.
 Mattie Brice, American video game designer, critic, and industry activist.
 Ashly Burch, American voice actress 
 Brie Code, former Ubisoft AI programming lead working on titles such as Child of Light, founder of TRU LUV, co-creator of #SelfCare, an Apple Best Of 2018.
 Lori Cole, American game designer and writer. She and her husband Corey Cole are best known for the Quest for Glory adventure/roleplaying game series from Sierra Online. Other games she's worked on include Mixed-Up Fairy Tales (1991), Shannara (1995), the School for Heroes web game, and the Kickstarter-funded Hero-U: Rogue to Redemption (2018).
Christina "Phazero" Curlee, African-American game designer and researcher, featured at IndieCade, SAAM, and Eyeo festival Author of Meaningful Level Design. Currently a game designer at Insomniac Games.
 Sarah Elmaleh, American voice actor and cofounder of the games conference gamedev.world
 Keiko Erikawa is a Japanese video game designer and co-founder of Koei. She formed Ruby Party team by only women and then the team developed and released  Angelique, the first Otome game, in 1994.
 Mary Flanagan, researcher 
 Rebecca Ford, Canadian game developer and voice actress, serving as community manager for Digital Extremes' Warframe and colloquially known as "Space Mom".
 Tracy Fullerton, American game designer, educator and writer. Fullerton's work has received numerous industry honors.
 Emily Greer, cofounder and CEO of Kongregate.
 Jennifer Hale,  voice actress best known for her work in video game franchises including Baldur's Gate, Mass Effect, Metroid Prime, Metal Gear Solid, Soulcalibur, Spider-Man, BioShock Infinite, Quest for Glory: Shadows of Darkness, and Star Wars: Knights of the Old Republic. In 2013, she was recognized by Guinness World Records for "the most prolific videogame voice actor (female)"
 Rebecca Heineman, American video game designer and programmer known for her work on The Bard's Tale, The Bard's Tale III: Thief of Fate and Myth III: The Wolf Age. Heineman is also considered the first national video game champion. 
 Amy Hennig, American video game director and script writer. Her writing creates include the Legacy of Kain series for Crystal Dynamics, and Jak and Daxter and Uncharted series for Naughty Dog.
 Jennifer Hepler, video game script writer best known for her work on BioWare's Dragon Age series.
 Miki Higashino, Japanese video game composer known for the Suikoden series.
 Robin Hunicke, producer of Journey and cofounder of Funomena.
 Marija Ilic, co-founder of Two Desperados - a Serbian game developer and President of the Board at Serbian Games Association. Featured as one of the "100 Game Changers" selected by gamesindusty.biz. 
 Emiko Iwasaki, artist and general director best known for her work on the Guilty Gear series, and Girls2Pioneers ambassador. 
 Jane Jensen, video game designer most known of the popular and critically acclaimed Gabriel Knight series of adventure games
 Yoko Kanno, Japanese composer, arranger and musician
 Junko Kawano, Japanese game designer, director, illustrator and writer best known as the co-creator of the Suikoden series and director of Shadow of Memories.
 Heather Kelley, media artist and video game designer, most famous as the founder of Perfect Plum, a start-up specializing for software for women. She is also a co-founder of the Kokoromi experimental game collective.
 Rieko Kodama, artist, director, and producer known for her work on the Phantasy Star series and other Sega titles including Skies of Arcadia and the 7th Dragon series.
 Aya Kyogoku, manager at Nintendo EPD with leading roles in Animal Crossing series production since 2008
 Christine Love, Canadian video game developer.
 Van Mai (nee Tran), developer of Wabbit (1982), the first console video game to feature a female protagonist. 
 Jessica Mak, game developer and musician, developed the games Everyday Shooter and Sound Shapes.
 Cathryn Mataga, designed Atari 800 games for Synapse Software and worked on the original Neverwinter Nights MMO.
 Manami Matsumae, Japanese video game composer
 Carla Meninsky, video game designer during the early years of the Atari 2600
 Ikumi Nakamura, Japanese artist and director, formerly of Clover Studio, PlatinumGames, and Tango Gameworks, with credits including Ōkami, Bayonetta, and The Evil Within.
 Zoë Quinn, developer of Depression Quest and subsequently a spokefigure against the harassment from the Gamergate controversy.
 Jade Raymond,  Canadian video game executive, founder of Electronic Arts' Motive Studios, head of Visceral Games, and former managing director of Ubisoft Toronto
 Siobhan Reddy, studio director of Media Molecule, a video game development studio based in the United Kingdom, most famous for their debut title LittleBigPlanet. She was named a BAFTA Fellowship in 2021.
 Brenda Romero, American game designer and developer notably of the Wizardry series. She has won several awards in her long career.
 Bonnie Ross, American video game developer and head of 343 Industries, the studio that manages the Halo video game franchise.
 Jehanne Rousseau, French video game creative director, co-founder and CEO of Spiders.
 Kellee Santiago, video game designer and producer.  While studying at the USC Interactive Media Division at the University of Southern California, Santiago produced the game Cloud which was developed by Jenova Chen and a team of students.  After graduating, Santiago and Chen founded Thatgamecompany, and Santiago took on the role of president. Santiago left Thatgamecompany in 2012. She is a backer for the Indie Fund, a TED fellow, and the head of developer relations for OUYA.
 Anita Sarkeesian, founder of Feminist Frequency and Tropes vs. Women in Video Games
Cher Scarlett, American software engineer who worked at Blizzard Entertainment and known for her role in California Department of Fair Employment and Housing v. Activision Blizzard
 Emilia Schatz, American game designer best known for her work at Naughty Dog
 Kim "Geguri" Se-yeon, South Korean esport professional and first female player signed into the Overwatch League. 
 Suzanne Seggerman, co-founder of Games for Change
 Carol Shaw, the first woman who was a full-time video game designer. She began as an Atari employee, designing and programming 3-D Tic-Tac-Toe (1979) for the Atari 2600. Shaw later joined Activision where she designed Happy Trails for the Intellivision and River Raid for the Atari 800 and Atari 5200 for which she is most widely known. Additionally, she designed an unreleased Polo game in 1978 and worked on the game Super Breakout.
 Kazuko Shibuya, Japanese video game artist known for her work with Square and Square Enix
 Yoko Shimomura, Japanese video game composer and pianist who has composed or contributed to nearly one hundred video game soundtracks.
 Tanya X. Short, American video game designer and founder of Kitfox Games, where she has worked on games such as Shattered Planet (2014) and Moon Hunters (2016). She co-founded Pixelles, an organisation that aims to address gender diversity in video game development.
Joelle Silverio,  American video game designer, software engineer, animator, and visual effects artist. Notably, the first African-American female game designer to drive design of a AAA game, with her work on Killing Floor 2 for Tripwire Interactive. Silverio began her career with Hi-Rez Studios, working on Global Agenda, Tribes: Ascend, and SMITE. She later worked on EVE Online, and World of Darkness for CCP Games before moving on to Killing Floor 2. As a Gameplay/Combat Designer, Silverio worked on Battlefield 2042:Portal for Electronic Arts. She is currently a Principal Game Designer with TEAM KAIJU, working on an unannounced FPS game for PC and console.
 Kim Swift, American video game designer best known for her work at Valve with games such as Portal and Left 4 Dead. Swift was featured by Fortune as one of "30 Under 30" influential figures in the video game industry. She was described in Mental Floss as one of the most recognized women in the industry and by WIRED as "an artist that will push the medium forward".
 Risa Tabata, assistant producer, designer, and director of various Nintendo video games, such as Paper Mario: Color Splash and Donkey Kong Country: Tropical Freeze.
 Gail Tilden, former marketing director for Nintendo of America, who helped with the marketing of the Nintendo Entertainment System in the United States and the creation of Nintendo Power.
Pauliina Tornqvist, Finnish video game producer known for her work at Activision, Ubisoft and other publishers, on gaming franchises such as Call of Duty, Watchdogs, Trials, Angry Birds, and Travian. Tornqvist started her career by founding her own mobile game studio only at the age of 20, before continuing to work across Europe and US on multiple AAA productions - while advocating in podcasts, industry panels, and schools for diversity and equity in the video game industry.
 Muriel Tramis, director of adventure games at Coktel Vision and recipient of France's Legion of Honour.
 Joyce Weisbecker, first woman to design commercial video games, creating several games for the RCA Studio II console in 1976.
 Roberta Williams, American video game designer and writer and a co-founder of Sierra On-Line (later known as Sierra Entertainment). She is known for her pioneering work in the field of graphic adventure games, with titles such as Mystery House, the King's Quest series, and Phantasmagoria, and is viewed as one of the most influential PC game designers of the eighties and nineties. She has been credited with creating the graphic adventure genre.
 Brianna Wu, game developer and co-founder of Giant Spacecat, and, in wake of the Gamergate controversy, has entered into politics to try to address issues raised during Gamergate.
 Michiru Yamane, Japanese video game composer known for her work with Konami and the Castlevania series.
 Corrinne Yu, American game programmer who started her career with the King's Quest series for the Apple II. Yu wrote the original engine for the Spec Ops series, and was a founding member of Microsoft's Direct 3D Advisory Board.
 Jen Zee, art director for Supergiant Games.

Others 
 Tina Amini, IGN editor-in-chief
 Amber Dalton, professional gamer
 Tanya DePass, founder of I Need Diverse Games
 Kate Edwards, geography game content and ex-executive director of the International Game Developers Association (IGDA)
 Megan Fox, founder of Glass Bottom Games
 Keisha Howard, founder of Sugar Gamers
 Nicole Lazzaro, founder of XEOPlay and XEODesign
 Holly Liu, lead designer of Kingdoms of Camelot and founder of Kabam
 Nika Nour, executive director of IGDA
 Veronica Ripley, founder of Transmission Gaming

References

 
Video games
Lists of women by occupation